Płociczno  ( (1938-45:Bunshausen)) is a village in the administrative district of Gmina Ełk, within Ełk County, Warmian-Masurian Voivodeship, in northern Poland.

The village has a population of 90.

References

Villages in Ełk County